Moi Day, (unofficially referred as Huduma Day), was a public holiday in Kenya. It was celebrated on October 10, it honored former Kenyan President Daniel Moi. Following the promulgation of the Constitution of Kenya in August 2010, Moi Day was removed from the list of Kenyan national holidays. However, on 8 November 2017, the High Court restored it as an October 10 public holiday.

Justice George Odunga in his ruling said the scrapping of the Moi Day holiday is an illegality and was in contravention of the law. On 8 October 2018, CS Matiang'i announced the Public Holiday's comeback.

On 19 December 2019 the cabinet approved the renaming of Moi Day to Huduma Day

References

Public holidays in Kenya
October observances